Mekkhaya (also spelled Mekkara) is a small town just south of Mandalay, Myanmar. It was a co-capital of the Myinsaing Regency from 1297 to 1313.

Notable people
 Yazathingyan: one of the cofounders of Myinsaing Regency
 Prince of Mekkhaya: 19th-century prince who tried to educational and administrative reforms during the reign of King Mindon

References

Populated places in Mandalay Region